Marge is a feminine given name, a shortened form of Marjorie, Margot or Margaret. Notable Marges include:

People
Marge (cartoonist) (1904–1993), pen name of Marjorie Henderson Buell, American cartoonist
Marge Anderson (1932–2013), Ojibwe Elder and politician for the Mille Lacs Band of Ojibwe
Marge Anthony (1935–2013), Canadian broadcaster and media executive
Marge Bishop (1910–1960), New Zealand cricketer
Marge Burns (1925–2009), American golfer
Marge Callaghan (1921–2019), American baseball player
Marge Carey (1938–2012), trade unionist and served as President of the Union of Shop, Distributive and Allied Workers (USDAW) from 1997 to 2006
Marge Chadderdon (born 1937), Republican Idaho State Representative
Marge Champion (1919–2020), American dancer and choreographer
Marge Frantz (1922–2015), American activist and women's studies academic
Marge Kõrkjas (born 1974), Estonian Paralympic swimmer
Marge Kotlisky (1927–1997), American actress
Marge Ostroushko (born 1951), public radio producer
Marge Piercy (born 1936), American poet, novelist, and social activist
Marge Redmond (1924–2020), American actress and singer
Marge Roukema (1929–2014), American politician
Marge Schott (1928–2004),  American baseball team owner 
Marge Simon (born 1942), American artist and writer
Marge Villa (born 1924), former utility player in the All-American Girls Professional Baseball League

Fictional characters
Marge Dursley, in the Harry Potter series
Marge Green, on the BBC soap opera EastEnders
Marge Gunderson, from the 1996 film "Fargo"
Marge Simpson, on the animated series The Simpsons
Marge Thompson in A Nightmare on Elm Street

English-language feminine given names
Given names derived from gemstones